Crane or cranes may refer to:

Common meanings
 Crane (bird), a large, long-necked bird
 Crane (machine), industrial machinery for lifting
 Crane (rail), a crane suited for use on railroads

People and fictional characters
 Crane (surname), including a list of people and fictional characters with the surname
 Crane (given name), a list of people

Places

Barbados
 The Crane, Saint Philip, Barbados

United Kingdom
 River Crane, Dorset
 River Crane, London, a small river of London, branch to the Thames

United States
 Crane, Indiana, a town
 Crane, Missouri, a town
 Crane, Montana, a census-designated place and unincorporated community
 Crane, Oregon, a census-designated place and unincorporated community
 Crane County, Texas
 Crane, Texas, a city and the county seat
 Crane, Virginia, an unincorporated community
 Crane, Washington, an unincorporated community
 Crane Creek (disambiguation)
 Crane Estate, Ipswich, Massachusetts, consisting of:
 Castle Hill
 Crane Beach
 Crane Island (Washington), one of the San Juan Islands
 Crane Mountain, Oregon
 Camp Crane, a World War I United States Army Ambulance Service training camp located in Allentown, Pennsylvania

Businesses
 Crane (St. Paul's Churchyard), a historical bookseller in London
 Crane & Co., a supplier of paper for US banknotes
 Crane Co., an American industrial products company
 Crane Bank, a commercial bank in Uganda.
 Crane Merchandising Systems, a vending machine manufacturer
 Crane Plumbing, a brand of plumbing fixtures made by American Standard Brands
 Crane-Simplex, an American car manufacturer, formerly named Crane Motor Car Company 
 The Crane Group Companies, an American construction and materials company

Arts and entertainment
 The Crane, a 1992 short film starring Jude Law
 Crane (TV series), a British TV series starring Patrick Allen, which ran from 1963 to 1965
 Cranes (band), a British alternative rock band
 Zhuravli ("Cranes"), a famous 1969 Russian song about World War II
 Orizuru, a classic Japanese origami sculpture in the shape of a crane

Martial arts
Fujian White Crane, a southern Chinese martial art
Tibetan White Crane, a western/southern Chinese martial art
 Crane kick

Schools in the United States
 Crane School of Music, part of the State University of New York (SUNY) at Potsdam, New York
 Crane Theological School, Medford, Massachusetts, a former seminary of Tufts University
 Crane High School (disambiguation)

Ships
 USFS Crane, a United States Bureau of Fisheries fishery patrol vessel in commission from 1928 to 1940 which also served from 1940 to 1960 in the fleet of the United States Fish and Wildlife Service as US FWS Crane
 , a United States Navy Wickes-class destroyer in commission from 1919 to 1922 and from 1939 to 1945
 USS Crane Ship No. 1, the name from 1941 to 1955 of a United States Navy crane ship which formerly served as the battleship

Other uses
  Cranē, a nymph named by Ovid, identified with the goddess Carna
 Cessna Crane, a British name for the United States built Cessna AT-17 Bobcat training aircraft
 Crane baronets, two extinct titles in the Baronetage of England
 Crane Melon, an heirloom melon

See also
 Crane shot, a shot taken with a camera mounted on a crane in motion pictures
 Crane fly
 Crain (disambiguation)